The Supreme Court of the United States handed down nine per curiam opinions during its 2016 term, which began October 3, 2016 and concluded October 1, 2017.

Because per curiam decisions are issued from the Court as an institution, these opinions all lack the attribution of authorship or joining votes to specific justices. All justices on the Court at the time the decision was handed down are assumed to have participated and concurred unless otherwise noted.

Court membership

Chief Justice: John Roberts

Associate Justices: Anthony Kennedy, Clarence Thomas, Ruth Bader Ginsburg, Stephen Breyer, Samuel Alito, Sonia Sotomayor, Elena Kagan, Neil Gorsuch (confirmed April 7, 2017)

Bosse v. Oklahoma

White v. Pauly

Rippo v. Baker

North Carolina v. Covington

Virginia v. LeBlanc

Jenkins v. Hutton

Hernandez v. Mesa

Pavan v. Smith

Trump. v. International Refugee Assistance Project

See also 
 List of United States Supreme Court cases, volume 580
 List of United States Supreme Court cases, volume 581
 List of United States Supreme Court cases, volume 582

References

 

United States Supreme Court per curiam opinions
Lists of 2016 term United States Supreme Court opinions
2016 per curiam